The Goold Building is a historic two-story concrete commercial building in downtown Carmel-by-the-Sea, California. The building is an example of Spanish Colonial Revival and  Monterey Colonial styles. The building qualified as an important commercial building in the city's downtown historic district property survey and was registered with the California Register of Historical Resources on February 3, 2003. The building has occupied the Coach Outlet since the 1990s.

History

Hotel Carmel
Note to be confused with Hotel Carmelo

The large two-story wood-shingled Hotel Carmel was built in 1898 by pioneer D. W. Johnson on the corner of San Carlos Street and Ocean Avenue. The original property was once owned by the Carmel Development Company. It was Carmel's second oldest hotel as Hotel Carmelo was built in 1889. 

The hotel was purchased by Dr. A. A. Canfield, who managed it, and later purchased by Charles O. Goold. In 1916, Goold rented the hotel space to various businesses such as the Lucky Boy Market, the Erickson's Carmel Dairy, and to Kenneth Wood for his real estate office.

On July 25, 1931, the Goold building was badly damaged by a fire that started in the antic of the building. The Carmel Fire Department was able to limit the damage to about $2,000. At the time, the building held the office of Peter Mawdsley, a Carmel real estate agent, and the Carmel Dairy. The upper floor was occupied by Mrs. Robert Erickson, daughter of Goold, who was not in the building during the fire. Goold died on December 2, 1931 and the site remained vacant until 1935.

New Goold building

A new Goold Building was built in July 1935. It is a large two-story concrete rectangular Spanish Colonial Revival style commercial building located at the same location on Ocean Avenue and San Carlos Street. It was built for Goold's wife Mary A. Goold, son Kenneth Goold, and Amy J. Goold. A grand opening of the building was announced in the July 12, 1934 Carmel Pine Cone with Carmel's first home-owned dime-store, operated by Victor D. Graham. Bostick & Wood occupied a large space on the corner of the building.

Two parts of the building, on the San Carlos Street side, are joined by a skylighted staircase, with Moorish tile risers and wrought iron gate, that leads to the top floor that were once used as apartments for the Goold family. They became offices for the Carmel Pine Cone from 1970 to 2000. The section of the building facing Ocean Avenue was designed by architect Guy O. Koepp and built by master builder  Michael J. Murphy in 1935. The building has a Spanish tiled hipped roof with overhanging eaves with a Monterey style balcony that wraps around the corner and supported by curved wooded corbels. The ground floor has a recessed corner entrance and deep-set display windows with white concrete walls. The upper floor has multi-pane windows. In 1988, a second story addition was added on the north end of the building with Spanish detail of the 1935 structure.

The building qualified for inclusion in the city's Downtown Historic District Property Survey, and was registered with the California Register of Historical Resources on February 3, 2003. The building qualifies under the California Register criterion 3, in architecture as a significant example of Spanish Colonial Revival and  Monterey Colonial styles. The Spanish designs, that dominated the commercial design of Carmel from 1925 to 1935 are similar to the Kocher Building (1927), El Paseo Building (1927), and the La Ribera Hotel (1929), now the Cypress Inn.

Charles O. Goold

Charles O. Goold (1871-1931) was a pioneer businessman, banker, landholder, and civic leader. In 1897 Goold came to Monterey, California where he worked at horse teaming, cutting wood and tanbark. After teaming for three years, he farmed in Carmel Valley, California, which he had visited as early as 1884. In 1907, he came to Carmel-by-the-Sea, California and ran a livery stable, taking parties over the 17-Mile Drive with a horse-drawn stage, and later automobile. He did local and long-distance hauling, and maintained special automobiles for trips through the valley. He also owned and conducted an auto-stage route from Monterey to Carmel.

See also
 Bank of Carmel
  Hotel Carmelo

References

External links

 Downtown Conservation District Historic Property Survey
 Official website

1935 establishments in California
Carmel-by-the-Sea, California
Buildings and structures in Monterey County, California
Spanish Colonial Revival architecture in California